Events from the 1260s in the Kingdom of Scotland.

Monarchs 

 Alexander III, 1249–1286

Events 
 July 1263 – Haakon IV of Norway sets sail to defend the Hebrides against Alexander III of Scotland, beginning the Scottish–Norwegian War.
 2 October 1263 – Alexander III launches an attack on the Norwegian forces at the Battle of Largs. The result is inconclusive but the following morning Haakon sails back to Orkney for the winter, where he dies at the Bishop's Palace, Kirkwall on 15 December.
 1263 – Balliol College, Oxford, England is founded by John I de Balliol. Its first statutes are sealed in 1282 by his widow, Dervorguilla of Galloway.
 24 November 1265 – with the death of Magnus Olafsson, the Isle of Man comes under direct Scottish rule.
 2 July 1266 – the Treaty of Perth is signed between Scotland and Norway, and the Isle of Man formally come under Scottish rule.

Births

Full date unknown 
 c. 1266 – John of Strathbogie, 9th Earl of Atholl, warden and Justiciar of Scotland (died 1306)
 1266 – Duns Scotus, philosopher–theologian (died 1308)

Deaths 

 25 December 1266 – Ada, Countess of Atholl

Full date unknown 

 1260 – John Bissett of Lovat
 1263 – William Comyn, Lord of Kilbride
 c. 1263 – Walter de Moravia
 1265 – Hugh Crawford, Sheriff of Ayrshire, (born 1195)
 1266 – Máel Coluim II, Earl of Fife
 c. 1268 – Freskin de Moray

See also 

 List of years in Scotland
 Timeline of Scottish history

References 

1260s